Malaga is a suburb of Perth, Western Australia, approximately 11 kilometres north of the CBD, in the City of Swan.

Early real estate development occurred in the decade before the first world war.

Etymology
The suburb is thought to be named after either the Spanish city of Málaga, or the Aboriginal word malaga which means ironstone. The name was approved in 1969.

Demographics
Malaga is an industrial precinct. Currently there are 2409 businesses with a workforce of over 12,000 people. The 2006 census listed only 28 people living in the suburb.

Significant facilities
The suburb contains a Transperth bus depot operated by Path Transit.

References

 
Suburbs of Perth, Western Australia
Suburbs and localities in the City of Swan